Trairão is a municipality in the state of Pará in the Northern region of Brazil.

Conservation

The municipality contains part of the Trairão National Forest, in which logging is permitted subject to a management plan.
It contains part of the  Altamira National Forest, a sustainable use conservation unit created in 1998.
It also contains part of the Jamanxim National Park, a fully protected area.
The municipality contains a small portion of the  Tapajós Environmental Protection Area, created in 2006.

The municipality contains part of the  Sawré Muybu Indigenous Territory, recognized by Funai in April 2016.

See also
List of municipalities in Pará

References

Municipalities in Pará